Kentucky Route 1747 (KY 1747) is an 18.424 mile (29.651 km) long north–south state highway in the immediate suburbs of Louisville, Kentucky.

Route description

The southern terminus of the route is at Grade Lane in the shadow of the Louisville International Airport in Louisville. The northern terminus is at Kentucky Route 22 (Brownsboro Road) in Worthington. From Grade Lane to the eastern terminus of the concurrency with Kentucky Route 864, KY 1747 is named Fern Valley Road. From KY 864 north to KY 22, the route is known as the Hurstbourne Parkway.

The portion of the route from U.S. Route 31E/U.S. Route 150 (Bardstown Road) near Wildwood Country Club north to KY 22 near Interstate 265 (Gene Snyder Freeway) is a four to six-lane suburban highway traversing the eastern suburbs of Louisville. The Hurstbourne Parkway passes adjacent to the headquarters of Churchill Downs Incorporated, plus both the A.B. Sawyer Park and the E. P. "Tom" Sawyer State Park, in this stretch.

History

An extension towards the General Electric Appliance Park was completed in 2005, connecting the existing Hurstborne Parkway with Fern Valley Road (then-Kentucky Route 1631), creating another loop around the southeastern end of Louisville located midway between Interstate 264 to the north and Interstate 265 to the south. KY 1747 was then extended westward along the length of Fern Valley Road to its current terminus at Grade Lane, replacing KY 1631, which was then reassigned farther downtown.

Major intersections

See also
 Roads in Louisville, Kentucky

References

External links

1747
1747
1747
Jeffersontown, Kentucky